Adam LeFevre (born August 11, 1950) is an American character actor, poet, and playwright who works in cinema, television, theater and commercials.

Biography
LeFevre was born in Albany, New York, the son of Helen (née Rhodes), a hospital patient representative, and Ira Deyo LeFevre, a physician. He completed his undergraduate at Williams College in 1972, and he holds graduate degrees from both the Iowa Playwrights Workshop and the Iowa Writers' Workshop at the University of Iowa.

In 2012, LeFevre appeared as Farley in the off-Broadway production of Him at Primary Stages.

Selected filmography

 Return of the Secaucus 7 (1979) .... J.T.
 Reckless (1984) .... Officer Haskell
 Second Sight (1989) .... Mike
 Tune in Tomorrow (1990) .... Large Albanian Man
 The Bonfire of the Vanities (1990) .... Rawlie Thorpe
 All My Children (1991, TV series) .... Dewitt
 That Night (1992) .... Mr. Carpenter
 Mr. Wonderful (1993) .... Kevin Klassic
 Philadelphia (1993) .... Jill's Husband
 Angie (1994) .... Museum Guard
 The Ref (1994) .... (1994) .... Gary
 Only You (1994) .... Damon Bradley
 The Search for One-eye Jimmy (1994) .... Detective
 Beautiful Girls (1996) .... Victor
 A Couch in New York (1996) .... Restaurant Patron
 The Mirror Has Two Faces (1996) .... Doorman
 Private Parts (1997) .... Sales Manager
 Jungle 2 Jungle (1997) .... Morrison
 In & Out (1997) .... Bachelor Party Guest
 Rounders (1998) .... Sean Frye
 Above Freezing (1998) .... Best Man at Wedding
 As the World Turns (1998, TV Series) .... Judge / Judge Collins / Judge Berlin
 Storm of the Century (1999, TV Mini-Series) .... Ferd Andrews
 Music of the Heart (1999) .... Mr. Klein
 You Can Count on Me (2000) .... Sheriff Darryl
 Ten Hundred Kings (2000) .... Frank
 L.I.E. (2001) .... Elliot
 Hearts in Atlantis (2001) .... Don Biderman
 Tadpole (2002) .... Phil
 Dummy (2002) .... Theater Director
 Emmett's Mark (2002) .... Officer Jim Fields
 Fabled (2002) .... Pharmacist
 Two Weeks Notice (2002) .... RV Man
 Nola (2003) .... Sam
 House of D (2004) .... Monty
 The Manchurian Candidate (2004) .... Congressman Healy
 Imaginary Heroes (2004) .... Bob Clyde
 Taxi (2004) .... Big Cop
 Hitch (2005) .... Speed Dating Guy
 Miss Congeniality 2: Armed and Fabulous (2005) .... Bartender
 Empire Falls (2005, TV Mini-Series) .... Father Mark
 Romance & Cigarettes (2005) .... Fruitman
 12 and Holding (2005) .... Gabe Artunion
 Unconscious (2006) .... Detective Rice
 Waltzing Anna (2006) .... Dr. Conley
 The Sensation of Sight (2006) .... Alice's Boss
 Arthur and the Minimoys (2006) .... Davido
 I Think I Love My Wife (2007) .... Maitre'd
 Mo (2007) .... Jim
 Day Zero (2007) .... Client
 The Invasion (2007) .... Richard Lenk
 The Babysitters (2007) .... Mr. Brown
 I Do & I Don't (2007) .... Father Makowski
 Pretty Bird (2008) .... Phil the Neighbor
 Fool's Gold (2008) .... Gary
 College Road Trip (2008) .... Judge
 Recount (2008, TV Movie) .... Mark Herron
 Adam (2009) .... Mr. Wardlow
 The Good Guy (2009) .... Billy
 Taking Woodstock (2009) .... Dave
 How to Seduce Difficult Women (2009) .... Ira
 She's Out of My League (2010) .... Mr. Kettner
 The Bounty Hunter (2010) .... Edmund
 The Scientist (2010) .... Dr. Alan Reed
 Fair Game (2010) .... Karl Rove
 Silver Tongues (2011) .... Police Chief
 Margaret (2011) .... Rob
 The Lucky One (2012) .... Judge Clayton
 The Dictator (2012) .... Man in Helicopter
 Alter Egos (2012) .... Local Man (uncredited)
 The Lifeguard (2013) .... Hans
 Molly's Theory of Relativity (2013) .... Boris
 Syrup (2013) .... Priest
 Night Has Settled (2014) .... Kimo
 The Adderall Diaries (2015) .... Bill DuBois
 Chasing Yesterday (2015) .... Jim
 The Program (2015) .... Jeffrey Tillotson
 Freeheld (2015) .... Don Bennett
 Almost Paris (2016) .... Richard
 Wild Oats (2016) .... Randall
 Love on the Run (2016) .... Bank Manager
 Gold (2016) .... Bobby Burns
 Radium Girls (2018) .... Carnival Barker

References

External links

1950 births
Living people
Male actors from New York (state)
20th-century American dramatists and playwrights
American male film actors
American male soap opera actors
American male stage actors
Williams College alumni
University of Iowa alumni
American male television actors
American male voice actors
Actors from Albany, New York